Taperoá is a municipality in Bahia, Brazil.

The municipality contains part of the  Caminhos Ecológicos da Boa Esperança Environmental Protection Area, created in 2003.

References

Municipalities in Bahia
Populated places established in 1569
1569 establishments in the Portuguese Empire